Álvaro Antón may refer to:

Álvaro Antón (footballer, born 1983), Spanish footballer
Álvaro Antón (footballer, born 1994), Spanish footballer